The following sortable table comprises the 150 highest mountain peaks of Canada with at least  of topographic prominence.

The summit of a mountain or hill may be measured in three principal ways:
The topographic elevation of a summit measures the height of the summit above a geodetic sea level.
The topographic prominence of a summit is a measure of how high the summit rises above its surroundings.
The topographic isolation (or radius of dominance) of a summit measures how far the summit lies from its nearest point of equal elevation.

Five major Canadian summits exceed , 11 exceed  elevation, 19 exceed , 41 exceed , 67 exceed , and 125 major summits exceed  elevation.



Highest major summits

Of these 150 highest major summits of Canada, 102 are located in British Columbia, 37 in Yukon, 13 in Alberta, two in Nunavut, and one in the Northwest Territories.  Three of these summits lie on the British Columbia-Alberta border and two lie on the British Columbia-Yukon border.  Five of these summits lie on the international Yukon-Alaska border and five lie on the international British Columbia-Alaska border.

Gallery

See also

List of mountain peaks of North America
List of mountain peaks of Greenland
List of mountain peaks of Canada
List of highest points of Canadian provinces and territories

List of the major 4000-metre summits of Canada
List of the most prominent summits of Canada
List of the most isolated major summits of Canada
List of extreme summits of Canada
List of mountain peaks of the Rocky Mountains
List of mountain peaks of the United States
List of mountain peaks of México
List of mountain peaks of Central America
List of mountain peaks of the Caribbean
Canada
Geography of Canada
:Category:Mountains of Canada
commons:Category:Mountains of Canada
Physical geography
Topography
Topographic elevation
Topographic prominence
Topographic isolation

Notes

References

External links

Natural Resources Canada (NRC)
Canadian Geographical Names @ NRC
Bivouac.com
Peakbagger.com
Peaklist.org
Peakware.com
Summitpost.org

Mountains of Canada
Lists of mountains of Canada
Lists of landforms of Canada
Canada, List Of The Highest Major Summits Of